Microsynodontis christyi is a species of upside-down catfish endemic to the Democratic Republic of the Congo, where it occurs in the central Congo river basin. This species grows to a length of  SL.

References

Further reading 
 

Mochokidae
Catfish of Africa
Fish of the Democratic Republic of the Congo
Endemic fauna of the Democratic Republic of the Congo
Fish described in 1920